Thanh Hải may refer to several places in Vietnam, including:

Thanh Hải, Bình Thuận, a ward of Phan Thiết 
Thanh Hải, Bắc Giang, a commune of Lục Ngạn District
Thanh Hải, Ninh Thuận, a commune of Ninh Hải District 
Thanh Hải, Hải Dương, a commune of Thanh Hà District 
Thanh Hải, Hà Nam, a commune of Thanh Liêm District